Ahaetulla sahyadrensis is a species of tree snake endemic to the Western Ghats of India. It is also reported from Bangladesh.

Taxonomy 
It was formerly considered conspecific with A. pulverulenta (now considered to be restricted to Sri Lanka), and was described as a subspecies of it (A. p. indica) by Paulus Edward Pieris Deraniyagala in 1955. However, a 2020 study recovered it as a distinct species. In addition, a now-defunct subspecies of Ahaetulla prasina, A. p. indica, was described by Rudolf Mell in 1931. Thus, the combination Ahaetulla pulverulenta indica would be a homonym to Ahaetulla prasina indica. To solve this, a new replacement name, A. sahyadrensis, was erected in 2020.

Geographic range 
This species is the most widespread of all vine snakes endemic to the Western Ghats, ranging from Gujarat south to Kerala and Tamil Nadu. It is also reported from Bangladesh.

Habitat 
It is found in moist deciduous and evergreen forests from just above sea level up to 1500 msl. They are usually found in the vicinity of perennial streams.

References 

Ahaetulla
Reptiles of India
Snakes of Asia
Endemic fauna of the Western Ghats
Reptiles described in 2020